Sandra Allen (born 1959, Quincy, Massachusetts) is an artist primarily known for minimalist graphite on paper drawings.

Allen has been using the tree as her subject since 1998. Allen has been represented by Mario Diacono in Boston, Massachusetts. She has also shown with Barbara Kraków and The Drawing Center, New York City. In September 2013, Allen was the first artist to be shown in Matthew Day Jackson and Laura Seymour’s gallery, Bunker259.

In 1978, Sandra Allen graduated from Quincy High School (Massachusetts). After, she graduated from the UMass Dartmouth School of Art in 1984 with a BFA and went on to graduate from the Yale University School of Art in 1989 with an MFA. In 2010, Allen revisited the teaching experience when she became a drawing instructor at the Massachusetts Institute of Technology in Boston, MA.

Sandra Allen has work in the permanent collections of:

The Museum of Fine Arts, Boston
The Fogg Art Museum at Harvard University
Yale University Art Gallery

References

1959 births
Living people
American artists
People from Quincy, Massachusetts
Artists from Massachusetts
Yale School of Art alumni
University of Massachusetts Dartmouth alumni